American Ninja Warrior Junior  is an American sports competition reality show on Universal Kids that premiered in 2018. It is the children's edition of American Ninja Warrior and American Ninja Warrior: Ninja vs. Ninja, which themselves are based on the Japanese game show Sasuke. As with the rest of the franchise, the series is produced by A. Smith & Co. In May 2021, it was announced that the third season would be moving to Peacock.

Format
American Ninja Warrior Junior is a head-to-head competition with multiple rounds and triple-elimination each episode. There are no teams, and each child contestant competes for themselves. Contestants are divided into age groups (9+10, 11+12, 13+14). Each age group has four contestants, with a total of 12 contestants per episode. Boys and girls compete with each other without segregation. Five runs in each age group are played to determine the episode's winner in each age group, for a total of three winners per episode, one per age group. Within each age group, the first two runs are seeding races without risk of elimination. Each run's winner then faces the other run's loser, with the two winners then facing each other to determine that episode's winner in that age group.

Obstacles
Obstacles are modified versions of those found in the two adult editions, to take account of the smaller size and strength of the young competitors. Obstacles in season 1 for the 9–10 age group include Sonic Swing, Tic Toc, I-Beam, Floating Tiles, Spin Cycle, and the Warped Wall. Obstacles for the 11–12 age group include two new obstacles: The Ring Toss and the Fly Wheels. Obstacles for the 13–14 age group include three new obstacles: The Archer Steps, Devil Steps and Flying Shelf Grab.

Obstacles in season 2 for the 9–10 age group include Shrinking Steps, Little Dipper, Spider Walls, Block Run, Flying Squirrel and the Warped Wall. Obstacles for the 11–12 age group include two new obstacles: The Double Tilt-Ladders and the Wingnuts. Obstacles for the 13–14 age group include three new obstacles: Floating Steps, Crazy Cliffhanger and the Sky Hooks.

Obstacles in season 3 for the 9–10 age group include Hopscotch, Lunatic Ledges, Liquid Pipes, Broken Bridge, Flying Saucers and the Warped Wall. Obstacles for the 11–12 age group include two new obstacles: Spike Crossing and Spring Forward. Obstacles for the 13–14 age group include two new obstacles: Sideways and Spinball Wizard.

Episodes

Seasons

Season 1
Season 1 premiered October 13, 2018, on Universal Kids television network. Season 1 was announced in late spring of 2018  and was filmed in Los Angeles. Matt Iseman and Akbar Gbajabiamila, who host the adult editions of the franchise, served as color commentators, with Laurie Hernandez as the on-course reporter. Contestants from the adult editions served as mentors to the Young competitors. This season these included Kevin Bull, Drew Drechsel, Natalie Duran, Meagan Martin, Najee Richardson, and Barclay Stockett.

The winners were Collin Cella (Ages 9+10), Kai Beckstrand (Ages 11+12) and Vance Walker (Ages 13+14). 2nd, 3rd and 4th place for 9–10 were, 4th Taylor Greene, 3rd Jacob Goldman, 2nd Sean Arms. 2nd, 3rd and 4th place for 11–12 were, 4th Caleb Brown (fell on the Ring Toss), 3rd Ella McRitchie, 2nd Tate Allen. And 2nd, 3rd and 4th place for 13–14 were, 4th Jeremiah Boyd (fell on the Flying Shelf Grab), 3rd Johnathan Godbout, 2nd Nate Pardo.

Season 1 was licensed in Canada by Family Channel.

Season 2
Season 2 premiered February 22, 2020, on Universal Kids. It was filmed in summer 2019. Paralympian Victoria Arlen replaced Hernandez as on-course reporter. Iseman and Gbajabiamila returned as color commentators. More than 140 children competed this season.

Among the competitors for Season 2 was the son of U.S. Olympic gold medalist gymnast Dominique Moceanu, Vincent Canales.

Like season 1, it was licensed in Canada by the Family channel.

The winners were Nathanael Honvou (Ages 9+10), Jack David (Ages 11+12) and Vance Walker (Ages 13+14). With his defeat of Kaden Lebsack in the championship round, Vance Walker became the first reigning champion of American Ninja Warrior Junior. (Ages 9+10) 2nd 3rd and 4th places were 4th Owen Pham 3rd Daniel Woods 2nd Reeder Smith Fell on spider walls (Ages 11+12) 4th Sienna Perez 3rd Tate Allen 2nd Naccsa Garemore (Ages 13+14) 4th Kai Beckstrand Fell on Crazy Cliffhanger 3rd Devan Alexander 2nd Kaden Lebsack.

The success of the format allowed the adult version in season 13 (aired in 2021) to drop the minimum age from 19 to 15. Kaden Lebsack, who was defeated by Walker in the championship round in the episodes taped in the summer of 2019, participated in his first year of eligibility and became the Last Ninja Standing, failing on the final stage at 70 feet into the 75 foot rope climb.

Season 3 
In May 2021, Peacock picked up the series for Season 3 with a 15-episode order. Iseman and Gbajabiamila would be returning as play-by-play announcer and color commentator respectively, alongside Arlen as on-course reporter. Season 3 was filmed during June 2021, and premiered on September 9, 2021.

The winners were as follows: Max Salebra (9 and 10), Bella Palmer (11 and 12), and Jackson Erdos (13 and 14). Bella Palmer was the first girl ever to win a championship in American Ninja Warrior Junior history.

See also
 Gladiators 2000, a children's edition of American Gladiators.

References

External links
 Official website (Universal Kids)
 Official website (NBC)
 

Universal Kids original programming
Peacock (streaming service) children's programming
Peacock (streaming service) original programming
Junior
Ninja Warrior (franchise)
2010s American children's game shows
2018 American television series debuts
2021 American television series endings
2010s American reality television series
2020s American reality television series
2020s American children's game shows
American television spin-offs
Reality television spin-offs
Television series about children
Television series about teenagers